Lok Sabha General elections were held in India between 5 September and 3 October 1999, a few months after the Kargil War. For the first time, a united front of political parties managed to win a majority and form a non-INC National government that lasted a full term of five years, thus ending a period of political instability at the national level in the country that had been characterized by three general elections held in as many years. In Gujarat, BJP won twenty seats with Congress winning only six seats out of total twenty-six seats.

Party-wise results summary

Results- Constituency wise

References

Indian general elections in Gujarat
1999 Indian general election
1990s in Gujarat